The 2000 Safari Rally (formally the 48th Sameer Safari Rally Kenya) was the third round of the 2000 World Rally Championship. The race was held over three days between 25 February and 27 February 2000, and was won by Subaru's Richard Burns, his 6th win in the World Rally Championship. Juha Kankkunen made it 1-2 for Subaru and Didier Auriol took SEAT's first (and only) podium of the season being third

Background

Entry list

Itinerary
All dates and times are EAT (UTC+3).

Results

Overall

World Rally Cars

Classification

Special stages

Championship standings

FIA Cup for Production Rally Drivers

Classification

Special stages

Championship standings

References

External links
 Official website of the World Rally Championship

Kenya
2000